KIAA1411, also known as KIAA1411, is a human gene.
It has one paralog, FAM135B.

References

Further reading